.cloud is a generic top-level domain (gTLD) delegated by ICANN. It is managed by the Italian company Aruba PEC SpA, a wholly owned subsidiary of the same Aruba S.p.A., one of the largest distributors of Hostings and Providers in Europe. 

The back-end services are provided by ARI Registry Services. The proposed application succeeded and was delegated to the DNS root zone on 26 Jun 2015.

The .cloud domain doesn't have any restriction.

See also
 List of Internet top-level domains

References

External links 
 .cloud – ICANNWiki

Cloud computing
Generic top-level domains